In molecular biology mir-590 microRNA is a short RNA molecule. MicroRNAs function to regulate the expression levels of other genes by several mechanisms.

Nicotine-induced atrial remodelling
Downregulation of miR-590 by nicotine has been found to play a key part in the generation of atrial fibrosis by atrial structural remodelling. This downregulation sees the removal of post-transcriptional repression of TGF-β1 and TGF-β receptor type II (TGF-βRII), and consequent collagen production. miR-590 downregulation has further been shown to be mediated by activation of alpha-7 nicotinic acetylcholine receptors (α7-nAChRs).

See also 
 MicroRNA

References

Further reading

External links 
 

MicroRNA
MicroRNA precursor families